Pedro Ruiz Delgado (born 30 March 2000) is a Spanish footballer who plays as a forward for French club Marseille II.

Career

Club career

Ruiz began his career with the youth teams of JD Valencina, Real Betis and Real Madrid, before making his professional debut for Spanish third division side Real Madrid Castilla in 2019. In 2021, he signed for Ligue 1 side Marseille, but was sent on a two-season loan to Dutch club NEC Nijmegen. On 17 October 2021, he made his for NEC during a home 1-0 defeat to local rivals Vitesse. He missed most of the rest of the 2021–22 season with knee injury and a subsequent surgery.

International career

He represented Spain internationally at the 2017 FIFA U-17 World Cup, appearing in two matches.

References

External links
 
 Career stats & Profile - Voetbal International

2000 births
Living people
Footballers from Seville
Association football forwards
Spanish footballers
Real Madrid Castilla footballers
NEC Nijmegen players
Eredivisie players
Spain youth international footballers
Spanish expatriate footballers
Expatriate footballers in the Netherlands
Spanish expatriate sportspeople in the Netherlands